Chak 87EB is a chak (village) in the Pakpattan District, Punjab, Pakistan. It is located four kilometers to the north-west of Qaboola and roughly ten kilometers south of Arifwala. Whole of the population consists on Muhajirs especially from District fazilka india.

Castes
Major castes in this village are Dhudi, joiya, sahus, mohals, wattus, kharals, sheikhs, kaliyas, Mughal, Rana RAJPOOT. etc.

Population
The approximate population of this village is 15000 with 6000 registered voters. The literacy rate is 55% and 10% are employed as government or semi-government servants member.

Populated places in Pakpattan District
Villages in Pakpattan District